"Ka-Ching!" is a 2003 song by Canadian singer Shania Twain. It was the second international single released from her 2002 album Up!. The song was written by Twain and Robert John "Mutt" Lange. "Ka-Ching!" was the second release to Europe and Central American markets following "I'm Gonna Getcha Good!". "Ka-Ching!" has become one of Twain's most successful singles in Europe to date. The song deals with consumer culture in the United States through the boom years of the 1990s and early 2000s. The line "all we ever want is more" is the general theme of the song.

Background and composition
The song was written by Robert Lange and Shania Twain. Lyrically, the song deals with what it considers to be the greed in the world. The tongue-in-cheek lyrics look at how our world revolves around money. It features an opening similar to Pink Floyd's "Money". According to Jennifer Nine from Yahoo! Music, "it's essentially Radiohead's "squealing Gucci little piggies" served up for those without Oxford educations and Naomi Klein's Guardian columns: "We spend the money that we don't possess/Our religion is to go and blow it all".

Lyrics and themes 
"Ka-Ching" centres on consumerism. Opening with sound of a cash register ringing, Twain then sings that the U.S. teaches children to want and want and want ("we live in a greedy, little world/that teaches every little boy and girl/to earn as much as they can possibly/then turn around and spend it foolishly") and that the adults do not know how to spend their money wisely, either ("we've created us a credit card mess/we spend the money that we doen't possess"). And as soon as the money is there, people will go to the new churches — the malls ("Our religion is to go and blow it all/so it's shoppin' every Sunday at the mall"). In the chorus, Twain sings the satisfaction and fulfillment people find in buying and having more money and things ("Can you hear it ring/it makes you wanna sing/it's such a beautiful thing -- Ka-ching!").

In the second verse, she sings that the shallow, materialistic people are irresponsible and will go to drastic lengths, including risking foreclosure on their home to buy more stuff ("when you're broke go and get a loan/take out another mortgage on your home/consolidate so you can afford/to go and spend some more when you get bored"). She taunts them in the bridge ("Dig deeper in your pocket/Oh yeah/Come on, I know you've got it/Dig deeper in your wallet").

Critical reception 
The song received mostly positive reviews from most music critics. S. Renee Dechert from PopMatters wrote that the song "stands out as different against the others." Jennifer Nine from Yahoo! Music commented that "musically, its Timbaland-style strings and off-kilter chorus are the best thing on the album." Jake Taylor from Sputnikmusic agreed, writing that the song is "one of the more triumphant moments of the album." Robert Christgau picked the song as one of the best tracks on the album. Lachlan Sutherland from "UK Mix" wrote: "The song is a definite stand out track, with  incredibly witty lyrics. It's very fresh and invigorating!." "Traveling to the Heart" wrote a very positive review, stating: "Twain's delivery matter-of-fact and matches the biting tone. With this gem, she proves that she is capable of writing music with some substance to it. Unlike her previous hits, 'Ka-Ching!' is against type. Pop music is being about glamorous, into high-fashion, and living in mansions. However, Twain sees the emptiness of it all and sings about something different for once."

Chart performance
"Ka-Ching!" has become one of Twain's biggest singles in Europe. In the UK, it became her sixth consecutive, seventh overall, top ten single. It debuted on March 22, 2003, at its peak at number eight. It remained on the entire chart for eight weeks. In all, "Ka-Ching!" hit the top ten in seven countries: Austria, Germany, Hungary, Romania, Switzerland, Portugal (where it reached #1) and the UK. It became her highest charting single in Germany, Austria, Switzerland and Hungary where it spent 62 weeks in the top 40.

Music video
The music video for "Ka-Ching!" was shot in the Casino Español and in a hotel in Mexico City, Mexico, and Madrid, Spain, in January 2003. It was directed by Finnish director Antti J, who also shot her video for "Up!" around the same time. The video debuted in Europe and Central and South America on February 25, 2003. It was not released to North American stations. The video depicts a city consumed with greed, Twain finds the streets empty and cars left abandoned while everyone is in a casino, sticking with the theme of the song. Scenes of Twain sporting a silver outfit and a red dress, both by Marc Bouwer are intercut throughout the video. These scenes are the base of two further versions of the video that lack the narrative and only show Twain performing the song in the studio. One of these two videos shows her in the silver outfit while in the other one, she is seen wearing the red dress. "Ka-Ching!" was released on YouTube in mid-2011.

Uses in media
"Ka-Ching!" appears in the Oxford University Press' New English File: Intermediate Student's Book, an ESL book.

Track listings
These are the formats and track listings of major single releases of "Ka-Ching!".

 CD maxi - Europe
 "Ka-Ching!" (Red) — 3:20
 "Ka-Ching!" (Sowatt Hip Hop Mix) — 3:22
 "Ka-Ching!" (Sowatt Extended Lounge Mix) — 9:09
 "I'm Gonna Getcha Good!" (Sowatt Dance Mix) — 4:32

 CD single - UK - Part 1
 "Ka-Ching!" (Red Version) — 3:20  	
 "Ka-Ching!" (the Simon & Diamond Bhangra Version) — 4:36 	
 "I'm Holding on to Love (to Save My Life)" (Live) — 3:27

 CD single - UK - Part 2
"Ka-Ching! 
"You're Still The One"
Enhanced: "I'm Gonna Getcha Good!" - Music Video

 CD single - France
 "Ka-Ching!" (Red) — 3:20
 "I'm Gonna Getcha Good!" (Sowatt Extended Dance Mix) — 7:57

 CD maxi - France
 "Ka-Ching!" (Red Version) — 3:20  	
 "You're Still the One" (Live) — 3:21 	
 "I'm Holding on to Love (to Save My Life)" (Live) — 3:30 	
 "Ka-Ching!" (the Simon & Diamond Bhangra Mix) — 4:36

Official versions
"Ka-Ching!" remains one of Twain's most genre-diverse songs. The main "Red" version is an upbeat rhythmic song with a Middle Eastern influence. The "Green" version has a country feel, and the "Blue" version is more worldly. Remixes have provided Hip hop, Lounge, and Bhangra versions.
Red Album Version (3:20)
Green Album Version (3:20)
Blue Album Version (3:33)
Sowatt Hip Hop Mix (3:22)
Sowatt Extended Lounge Mix (9:09)
The Simon & Diamond Bhangra Mix (4:36)
Live from Chicago (3:41)

Charts

Weekly charts

Year-end charts

Certifications

Release history

References

2003 singles
Shania Twain songs
Songs written by Robert John "Mutt" Lange
Song recordings produced by Robert John "Mutt" Lange
Songs written by Shania Twain
Mercury Records singles
Mercury Nashville singles
Songs about consumerism
Songs against capitalism
Number-one singles in Portugal